Scouting in Minnesota has a long history, from the 1910s to the present day, serving thousands of youth in programs that suit the environment in which they live.

Boy Scouts of America in Minnesota today
There are eight Boy Scouts of America (BSA) local councils serving Minnesota. In addition, the Northern Tier National High Adventure Bases of the BSA is located in Minnesota.

Central Minnesota Council
CMC is headquartered in Sartell, Minnesota.  Ranging from Nevis and Park Rapids in the northwest to Elk River in the southeast, the council serves 46 communities in the area.

Central Minnesota Council is made up of four districts:
North Star District
Pine Tree District
Scenic District
Gateway District

Parker Scout Reservation
Central Minnesota Council is home to Parker Scout Reservation, which was established in 1941 by Clyde Parker.

Naguonabe Lodge
The Central Minnesota Council is supported by Naguonabe Lodge #31 of the Order of the Arrow. Naguonabe Lodge #31 was founded in 1927.

Gamehaven Council
Gamehaven Scouting serves seven counties in southeast Minnesota.  From its council office located in Rochester MN, its area ranges from Red Wing MN to Winona MN to Owatonna MN and is bordered to the south by Iowa and the east by Wisconsin.

In Rochester alone, there are more than 2,000 Scouts, including 26 Cub Scout packs (grades first through fifth) and more than 20 Scouts BSA troops (sixth grade through age 18). For older youth, Venturing is a high adventure outdoor program while Explorer Posts partner with firms like the Mayo Clinic, Cascade Veterinary Hospital, Gold Cross Ambulance, and Rochester Police to offer career development activities (age 14 through 21, coed).

Gamehaven Scouting consists of these districts:
Hiawatha District
Sugar Loaf DistrictWakpaota District

Blue Ox Lodge
Gamehaven Scouting is supported by Blue Ox Lodge #26 of the Order of the Arrow.

Gamehaven Paddles
Gamehaven Scouting has volunteers who are certified by the American Canoe Association in both canoeing and kayaking. Youth awards and leader training is available on request to in-council, other councils, and to the public.  Our kayak fleet ranges from recreational kayaks appropriate for Webelos Scouts to kayaks suitable for training for Lake Superior and Seabase trips.  Gamehaven provides solo canoe training with Wenonah Argosy solo canoes as well as traditional tandem canoeing.  Check out the Google Group called Gamehaven Paddles.

Gateway Area Council

Gateway Area Council serves Scouts in Wisconsin and Minnesota.

Northern Star Council

Located in Saint Paul, Minnesota, Northern Star Council was formed from the merger of Viking Council and Indianhead Council in 2005.

Northern Lights Council

As of 2006, Northern Lights Council serves all of North Dakota, and parts of South Dakota, northwest Minnesota and northeast Montana.  Voyageur Trails District is one of two NLC Districts in Minnesota.

Camp Wilderness
Northern Lights Council is home to Camp Wilderness, located on Bad Axe Lake near Emmaville, Minnesota in Hubbard County, Minnesota. Founded by Herman Stern in 1946, Camp Wilderness is a  camp. On August 18, 2006, the camp celebrated its 60th Anniversary by opening the Butler Wilderness Outpost, a Cub Scout camp for the scouts to attend. Camp Wilderness is, by area, the largest Scouts camp owned and operated by a Minnesota Scouting Council, although the National Council owns the much larger Philmont Scout Ranch in New Mexico, and the slightly larger Charles L. Sommers Northern Tier Base, also located in Minnesota.

Sioux Council

Headquartered in Sioux Falls, South Dakota, Sioux Council serves Scouts in South Dakota, Iowa and Minnesota.

Buffalo Ridge District serves Lincoln, Lyon, and Murray counties in Minnesota.  Camp Shetek is located in Murray County on Lake Shetek near Currie, Minnesota.
Prairie Hills District serves Pipestone, Nobles, and Rock counties in Minnesota.

Twin Valley Council
Located in Mankato MN.
River Stone District
Cedar Valley District
Western Prairie District

Cuyuna Scout Camp
Twin Valley Council is home to Cuyuna Scout Camp, established as Camp Cuyuna in 1967. Additionally, Lake Russell (originally Command Lake) sits entirely within the boundaries of Cuyuna Scout Camp. Cuyuna Scout Camp ("Cuyuna," for short) is located northeast of Crosslake, Minnesota. Campsites are arranged for scouts to sleep and eat as patrols with a central troop assembly area. Patrols draw their rations from a central Commissary and cook all of their meals together except for two Camp-wide meals, on Sunday and Friday nights.

Voyageurs Area Council

Headquartered in Hermantown, Minnesota, Voyageurs Area Council serves Scouts in Minnesota, Wisconsin, and Michigan. Its Order of the Arrow Lodge is Ka'niss Ma'ingan Lodge #196.

Girl Scouting in Minnesota Today

Three Girl Scout Councils serve Minnesota.

Girl Scouts - Dakota Horizons
See Scouting in South Dakota.  Serves a large portion of northwestern Minnesota and Rock County in southwestern Minnesota.

Headquarters: Sioux Falls, South Dakota
Web Site: http://www.gsdakotahorizons.org

Girl Scouts of Minnesota and Wisconsin Lakes and Pines Council
Lakes and Pines Council serves 11,000 girls in 39 counties throughout
the northern half of Minnesota and northwest corner of Wisconsin.
Northern Pine and Land of Lakes Councils joined together Jan. 1, 2008
to form Girl Scouts of Minnesota and Wisconsin Lakes and Pines.

Headquarters: Waite Park, Minnesota
Website: http://www.girlscoutslp.org

Camps:
Camp Roundelay is  near Minong, Wisconsin
Camp Sanderson is  near Spicer, MN.

Girl Scouts of Minnesota and Wisconsin River Valleys
In partnership with 18,000 adult volunteers, the Girl Scouts of Minnesota and Wisconsin River Valleys helps nearly 45,000 girls each year—in all or portions of 49 counties in southern Minnesota and western Wisconsin.

Headquarters: St. Paul, Minnesota
Website: http://www.girlscoutsrv.org

Camps:
 Camp Elk River is  near Zimmerman, MN.
 Camp Lakamaga is near Marine, MN.
 Camp Northwoods is  near Mason, WI.
 Camp Singing Hills is  near Waterville, MN
 Camp Whispering Hills is near Houston, MN

Scouting museums in Minnesota

 Many Point Scout Camp History Center
 North Star Museum of Boy Scouting and Girl Scouting, North Saint Paul, Minnesota

See also

 Scouting in Manitoba
 Scouting in Ontario

References

External links

Council Websites
 Central Minnesota Council
 Gamehaven Council
 Northern Star Council
 Sioux Council
 Twin Valley Council
 Voyageurs Area Council
Girl Scout Council Websites
 Lakes and Pines Council

Youth organizations based in Minnesota
Minnesota
Central Region (Boy Scouts of America)